Exile is a 2020 Kosovan thriller drama film directed by Visar Morina. It was selected as the Kosovan entry for the Best International Feature Film at the 93rd Academy Awards, but it was not nominated.

Synopsis
A Kosovan immigrant living in Germany believes he's a victim of xenophobia, but it may be his own paranoia spiraling out of control.

Cast
 Mišel Matičević as Xhafer
 Sandra Hüller as Nora
 Rainer Bock as Urs
 Thomas Mraz as Manfred
 Daniel Sträßer as Georg

See also
 List of submissions to the 93rd Academy Awards for Best International Feature Film
 List of Kosovan submissions for the Academy Award for Best International Feature Film

References

External links
 

2020 films
Albanian-language films
2020 thriller films
2020 drama films
2020 thriller drama films
2020s German-language films
Kosovan drama films
German drama films

Kosovan thriller films
Kosovan thriller drama films
German thriller films
German thriller drama films